The Prairie Village, Herman and Milwakuee Railroad is a heritage railroad in Prairie Village, which is next to Lake Herman; it operates from May to September. The railroad uses former Milwakuee Road trackage as its 2-mile line, and it operates one of the few remaining church railroad cars, the Emmanuel; it is also staffed entirely by volunteers. They operate two diesel engines, but have also set up steam engines for events.

References 

Heritage railroads in South Dakota
Passenger rail transportation in South Dakota
Tourist attractions in Lake County, South Dakota
Standard gauge railways in the United States
Transportation in Lake County, South Dakota